Student Job Search is a not-for-profit incorporated society, owned by 18 student associations from New Zealand’s leading universities and polytechnics. It is funded by the New Zealand government, whilst operating independently.

Overview

Student Job Search (SJS) is a free service that connects household and business employers with intending, current and graduate tertiary students looking for work.

SJS is funded on the number of students placed in jobs every year. Instead of charging for their service, SJS requires that its students and employers provide information about what jobs they've got or who they've hired through the service.

History
From 1977 to 1982 the Department of Labour ran the Student Community Service Programme to help university, polytechnic and college of education students to find work during the summer vacation period.

In 1982 Student Job Search was established as a service to help tertiary students find casual work to help alleviate student poverty. Originally the service was campus-based and the individual university student unions established management committees to run the service.

In 1986 all Student Job Search operations were co-ordinated by the newly established Student Job Search Aotearoa Incorporated and funded to a large degree by an annual grant from the government. By 1997 there were eight main regional offices and another 15 additional offices during the busy summer period.

A restructure took place in 2004 and the six regional incorporated societies were dissolved, transferring all assets, liabilities and employees to Student Job Search Aotearoa Incorporated. A general manager was appointed to manage all operations and staff and the national office was located in Dunedin.

By 2010-11 Student Job Search’s national office had re-located to Wellington and established a centralised call centre in the same office. In September 2012 all seven regional offices were closed as students were applying for jobs online.

Purpose

Set-up to help tertiary students find employment, and now funded by the government for that purpose (see below); Student Job Search registers students and employers to make it easier for students to find, and for employers to fill jobs that would suit tertiary students.

Service for students
All current, intending and recently graduated tertiary students from a registered and approved tertiary education provider can register. 
Students find jobs they are interested in on the website and complete an online application form. In some cases, students will need to call SJS to check that they are right for the job and the job is right for them. The system filter will also check that they meet the basic job requirements before they are referred to the employer.

Service for employers
Employers can list jobs themselves online or they can contact SJS and list the job over the phone. Once they've received applications, employers decide whether to shortlist and/or offer a student the job. The service is free for employers to list jobs.

Governance
Student Job Search is governed by a National Council made up of elected current presidents of member student associations, and several appointed independents.

Student Job Search members 

Student organisations that are members of Student Job Search Incorporated Society

Funding
The Ministry of Social Development (MSD) provides over 90% of the funding Student Job Search receives to deliver their services to support students in securing the employment they need to fund their studies and improve their post graduate employment prospects. Funding from other sources also comes from Student Job Search Members (see list above).

References 

Student organisations in New Zealand